Green Lake was a freshwater crater lake in Puʻu Kapoho crater on the island of Hawaiʻi.

Hawaiian myths state that the lake was the first place visited by Pele, the volcano deity. The lake was a popular swimming spot for locals and tourists. Extensive vegetation, mainly Hibiscus tiliaceus, overhung the lake, shading about twenty percent of the lake's surface.

On June 2, 2018, the lake was destroyed when lava flowing from Kīlauea's lower Puna eruption boiled it away and completely filled the entire basin.

See also 

Halalii Lake
Halulu Lake

References

External links 
 Peter T Young: Ka Wai O Pele

Lakes of Hawaii
Bodies of water of Hawaii (island)
Former lakes of the United States
Kīlauea